Goicoechea is a canton in the San José province of Costa Rica.

History 
Goicoechea was created on 6 August 1891 by decree 66.

Geography 
Goicoechea has an area of  km² and a mean elevation of  metres.

Districts 
The canton of Goicoechea is subdivided into the following districts:
 Guadalupe
 San Francisco
 Calle Blancos
 Mata de Plátano
 Ipís
 Rancho Redondo
 Purral

Demographics 

For the 2011 census, Goicoechea had a population of  inhabitants.

Transportation

Road transportation 
The canton is covered by the following road routes:

Rail transportation 
The Interurbano Line operated by Incofer goes through this canton.

References 

Cantons of San José Province
Populated places in San José Province
1891 establishments in Costa Rica
Populated places established in 1891